The Victoria Falls Hotel is a historic luxury hotel at Victoria Falls, Zimbabwe, dramatically situated with a view of the Second Gorge and the Victoria Falls Bridge from its terrace.

It is a member of The Leading Hotels of the World marketing organisation and managed by African Sun Limited and Meikles.

History
The hotel was opened in 1904 to accommodate passengers on the newly built National Railways of Zimbabwe railway, part of the planned Cape to Cairo Railway. Later it was a staging post for the BOAC flying boat service between Southampton and South Africa. In September 1904, Princess Christian of Schleswig-Holstein and her daughter, Princess Helena Victoria became the first royal guests of the newly opened hotel. The hotel has accommodated royal visitors on several occasions, including King George VI and his family in April 1947.

The hotel has been the site of a number of important political meetings.  In 1949 Roy Welensky organised a conference there to discuss the creation of the Federation of Rhodesia and Nyasaland, and in 1963, the Victoria Falls Conference at the hotel led to the breakup of the federation.

It hosted the 1975 Victoria Falls Conference to try to sort out Rhodesia's Unilateral Declaration of Independence that followed the break-up of the Federation.

References

External links 
 

1904 establishments in Southern Rhodesia
Buildings and structures in Matabeleland North Province
Hotels in Zimbabwe
Hotels established in 1904
Hotel buildings completed in 1904
The Leading Hotels of the World
Victoria Falls
Hotels in Victoria Falls